(17 October 1972), known professionally as Pablo Valentín is a theater, film and television actor best known for his role as Pedro in Vecinos.

Early life 
Born in Guadalajara, Jalisco, Mexico, Valentín has appeared in telenovelas such as The Color of Passion, Vecinos, and Por ella soy Eva.  Valentín is married to Mariana Treviño and has three children. He is one of three children, his sister is Indra Duarte and his brother is Eduardo Toscano.

Career 
Valentín made his debut in theater at the age of 14 in El príncipe de las hadas (The Prince of Fairies). His father is a theater director and acting teacher and encouraged him to join the theater.  He has stated that working in theater is like "going home" but sees himself as a "melodramatic actor". His father was a theater director. In 2001 he made his television debut in La familia P. Luche.

In 2012 he joined the cast of the comedy telenovela Por ella soy Eva as Fernando Contreras, a macho character that results in his downfall as he tries to maintain his role as the man of the house while his character's wife's career is rising. Valentín worked alongside Jaime Camil, Lucero (entertainer) and Carlos de la Mota in the series. He participated in The Color of Passion with Erick Elías, Helena Rojo and René Strickler as Mario Hernández in 2014.

Valentín took on the role of Abel Cruces in the TV series Yago in 2016, a role that he enjoyed because he found his character interesting. The series revealed his character's nuances in fragments through flashbacks, which explained the character's attitude.

In 2017, he participated in the production of Un Fantasma en el Espejo (The Ghost in the Mirror) in Guadalajara, Mexico, a show that one news outlet said it would "make you tremble with fear".

Also in 2017, Valentín took to the stage with Violeta Isfel after the performance of the whodunit La estética del crimen (The Aesthetics of Crime) in Mexico City to count and announce the audience votes. During the performance the audience had the opportunity to decide and vote on who they thought was the culprit. Valentín and Isfel also announced their upcoming performance, Las mujeres son de Venus y los hombres ni madres (Women are from Venus and men are not).

Filmography

Stage 
 Barataria: Estado de México - 2018
 El fantasma en el espejo (The Ghost in the Mirror) - 2017
 Festival Internacional Cervantino - 2016
 Marido en venta - 2012

Awards and nominations

References

External links

1972 births
21st-century Mexican male actors
20th-century Mexican male actors
Living people
Mexican male film actors
Mexican male stage actors
Mexican male telenovela actors
Male actors from Mexico City